"The Race" is the debut single by American rapper Tay-K. It was originally released on SoundCloud independently on June 30, 2017, but was later re-released for digital download and streaming by 88 Classic and RCA Records on July 29, 2017. The song charted at number 44 on the US Billboard Hot 100, and is from his debut mixtape, Santana World.

Background
Tay-K (whose real name is Taymor Travon McIntyre) recorded and released "The Race" while a fugitive from the police after escaping house arrest before his trial on capital murder charges. Tay-K makes references to this during the song, with the chorus being: "Fuck a beat, I was tryna beat a case. But I ain't beat that case, bitch I did the race." The charges (on which McIntyre was later convicted) stemmed from a home invasion where 21 year old Ethan Walker was killed.

The song was later presented at Tay-K's trial on the aforementioned murder charges as it contained details of the murder and his motivations for it. During the chorus of the song, Tay-K says:

McIntyre released several songs while on the run from the police, including "The Race", which was recorded during McIntyre's stay in New Jersey and the music video was released on YouTube two hours after his capture. "The Race" debuted at number 70 on the US Billboard Hot 100 after a large hashtag campaign pursuing the release of McIntyre using the hashtag "#FREETAYK". "The Race" peaked at 44 on the Billboard Hot 100.

Remixes
"The Race" has been remixed by numerous artists, including YBN Nahmir, Lil Yachty, Fetty Wap, Tyga, Moneybagg Yo, Montana of 300, Isaiah Rashad, Rico Nasty, and Key Glock among others. The official remix features guest vocals from 21 Savage and Young Nudy.

Music video
McIntyre premiered the official music video for "The Race" on June 30, 2017 on the ALL BUT 6 YouTube channel. The song quickly went viral with Shawn Cotton, the owner of a popular rap news page, Say Cheese TV, confirming that it was shot while Tay-K was on the run and became a smash hit. "It's real. Look at the story. It's so authentic. It's real, and he has the story to back up. Rappers talk shit all day about what they do, but everything he's saying, happened. It's like Tay-K was telling us a story. It's like we're little kids about to go to bed, and Tay-K's telling us a story about himself, and he's visualizing it in the video. And it happened. It's all on the news." Its music video currently has over 200 million views on YouTube. The video was also used as evidence at Tay K's trial for robbery and murder in July 2019. He was sentenced to 55 years in prison.

Charts

Weekly charts

Year-end charts

Certifications

References

2017 debut singles
2017 songs
Tay-K songs